Reineckeites is a Lower Jurassic ammonite belonging to the ammonitid.

Distribution 
Chile, China, Europe, Madagascar and Alaska

References
Notes

Jurassic ammonites
Ammonitida genera
Perisphinctoidea